Zind Pur is a village which falls in North West Delhi district situated in NCT of Delhi state. Its nearest railway station is Khera Kalan which is 3.39 km away.

Demographics 
The total geographical area of village is 273 hectares. Zind Pur has a total population of 11359 peoples(2020).The male and female populations are 6164 and 5195 respectively.

References 

Villages in North West Delhi district